Yakuhananomia tui is a species of beetle in the genus Yakuhananomia of the family Mordellidae. It was described in 1996.

References

Mordellidae
Beetles described in 1996